Guilherme Giovannoni (born June 2, 1980) is a Brazilian former professional basketball player. He played at the power forward position for several clubs in Brazil and Europe. Currently, he is a commentator on the National Basketball Association
and Novo Basquete Brasil for ESPN Brasil.

Professional career
During his pro career, Giovannoni has played with UniCEUB/BRB and several other clubs in the top-tier level Brazilian League.

National team career
Giovannoni has competed with the senior men's Brazilian national basketball team, at the 2002, 2006, 2010, and 2014 FIBA World Cups.  He was also a part of the Brazilian teams at the 2012 Summer Olympics, and the 2016 Summer Olympics.

References

External links
FIBA Profile
Euroleague.net Profile
LatinBasket.com Profile
Italian League Profile 
Spanish League Profile 
Novo Basquete Brasil Profile 

1980 births
Living people
Baloncesto Fuenlabrada players
Basketball players at the 2003 Pan American Games
Basketball players at the 2011 Pan American Games
Basketball players at the 2012 Summer Olympics
Basketball players at the 2016 Summer Olympics
Basket Rimini Crabs players
BC Kyiv players
Brazilian expatriate basketball people
Brazilian expatriate basketball people in Spain
Brazilian expatriates in Italy
Brazilian expatriate sportspeople in Ukraine
Brazilian men's basketball players
Brazilian people of Italian descent
CR Vasco da Gama basketball players
Esporte Clube Pinheiros basketball players
Gijón Baloncesto players
Italian men's basketball players
Lega Basket Serie A players
Liga ACB players
Novo Basquete Brasil players
Olympic basketball players of Brazil
Pallacanestro Biella players
Pallacanestro Treviso players
Pan American Games gold medalists for Brazil
Pan American Games medalists in basketball
People from Piracicaba
Power forwards (basketball)
Small forwards
Sport Club Corinthians Paulista basketball players
UniCEUB/BRB players
Virtus Bologna players
2014 FIBA Basketball World Cup players
2010 FIBA World Championship players
2006 FIBA World Championship players
2002 FIBA World Championship players
Medalists at the 1999 Pan American Games
Medalists at the 2003 Pan American Games
Sportspeople from São Paulo (state)